PCCI Group is a multinational business process outsourcing (BPO) company focused on providing an adaptable call-centre service for any business operating within these areas of expertise:

 Travel and Hospitality
 Telecommunications
 Media and Entertainment
 Banks, Fintech and Insurance
 E-commerce
 Healthcare
 BPO and Government agencies
 Technology
 Utilities
 Retail.

In 2022 the company celebrated its 20th year in business as it now owns and operates 12 "contact centres" distributed through 8 African countries.

While operations are based in Africa, the company has contracts being outsourced from Europe and the Middle East.

History and Company Growth

Founded in 2002, the company started off with a single call centre out of Senegal only functioning with a maximum capacity of 300 employees/'callers'.  PCCI Group is furthermore in partnership with its parent company: the Teyliom Group. With Teyliom Group offering services generally considered to be part of Telecommunications services, the partnership was struck up quite naturally due to the two companies complementing each others functions. PCCI started its operations with Orange in France by offering services in the field of customer acquisition and commercial telemarketing and continued growing to offer national and international, multichannel services. The company is continuing to establish itself in the call-centre and telecommunications market, often being recognised for its consistent and branded customer service. Since opening its doors in 2002, the group has constantly continued to expand its activities with the opening of various subsidiaries in a variety of African countries through the years; an example of this is the opening of its subsidiary in Côte d'Ivoire in 2010 after having partnered up with MTN Côte d'Ivoire in 2007.

Clients
PCCI Group delivers its services primarily in English and France and holds multiple Fortune 500 companies as clients; this includes European, Middle East and African leaders in telecommunications, media, BFSI, energy, retail and tourism.

Locations
PCCI headquarters are located in Dubai (UAE) with operations in Paris (France), London (United Kingdom) and in emerging markets. Beyond its HQ the company holds active 12 active call-centres distributed through 8 African countries.

References

Outsourcing companies
Call centre companies